The Avenger is a single-seat, Canadian low-wing, tractor configuration ultralight aircraft. The Avenger was introduced in 1994 and is available as a kit or as plans from Fisher Flying Products.

Fisher Flying Products was originally based in Edgeley, North Dakota, United States, but relocated to Vaughan, Ontario, Canada.

Development

The Avenger was designed to meet the requirements of the United States FAR 103 Ultralight Vehicles regulations, including the maximum  empty weight.

The Avenger was initially marketed with the now-discontinued Rotax 277 engine, which was criticized as leaving the aircraft dangerously underpowered.

Reviewer Andre Cliche says:

Design
The Avenger structure is entirely constructed from wood, with a low wing braced to the landing gear. The wooden-framed wing is covered with aircraft fabric. The engine cowling is fibreglass. The conventional landing gear features a steerable tailwheel and main-gear suspension.

The cockpit has a removable canopy.

The Avenger has an estimated construction time of 400 hours from the kit.

In 2022 the kit price (without paint, varnish, pilot/passenger restraints, instruments, upholstery, or engine) was US$9320, with the plans selling for US$350.

Recommended engines include the  Rotax 503,  Rotax 447,  2SI 460-35 or  1/2 VW.

Operational history

In December 2004, the company reported that 50 Avengers were flying, the majority as US unregistered ultralights.

Variants
Avenger
With a regular firewall for two-stroke engines. Engine options are  Rotax 447,  Rotax 503, or  Hirth F-33 or  2SI 460-35. Thirty-five had been completed and flown by the end of 2011.
Avenger V
With a 2" narrower firewall to accommodate VW engines. Engines include the  1/2 VW and the  Volkswagen air-cooled engine. Thirty had been completed and flown by the end of 2011.

Specifications (Avenger with Rotax 503)

See also

References

External links

Official website
Photo of a Fisher Avenger with VW engine - rear view
Photo of a Fisher Avenger with VW engine - front view

1990s Canadian ultralight aircraft
Aircraft first flown in 1994
Low-wing aircraft
Single-engined tractor aircraft